Ohio Adjutant General's Department is in the executive branch of government in the State of Ohio concerned with the military forces of the State of Ohio in the United States of America.

The Adjutant General has responsibility for the Ohio Army National Guard, the Ohio Air National Guard, the Ohio Naval Militia and the Ohio Military Reserve.

List of Adjutants General

Notes
(this document disagrees with the above chart, period 1810 - 1819.  It does not show Worthington's second stint.)
(This source say that before the civil war "Ormsby M. Mitchel was for two years Adjutant-General of the State of Ohio")

Government of Ohio
Military in Ohio
1803 establishments in Ohio
Adjutants general of the National Guard of the United States